West Hills High School (WHHS) is a public, comprehensive high school located in Santee, California, and serves students in grades nine through twelve. Opened in 1987, West Hills is the eleventh of thirteen high schools to be constructed in the Grossmont Union High School District which serves the east county area of San Diego County.

History
West Hills High opened as a satellite campus for Santana High School in 1985 to accommodate the overcrowding. Freshmen took classes in the morning, then were bused back to Santana for afternoon classes. On September 7, 1987, West Hills High School opened its doors to a new class of freshmen and officially became the district's 10th high school. The first phase of permanent construction was completed just prior to the 1990-91 school year. In June 1991 the first graduating class held its graduation ceremony at San Diego State University.

Timeline
1985 - West Hills High opens as a satellite of Santana High School.
1987 - West Hills High School opens with 14 teachers and 320 freshmen.
1988 - Cross Country runners Josh Hutton and Amanda Locke become the first ever state qualifiers at West Hills in any sport.
1989 - Construction began on the  campus, to be completed in two phases.
1990 - First Phase of construction is completed. It includes the Gym, Library, Science Building, and other buildings.
1990 - West Hills Wolf Pack Football wins first league championship.
1991 - First graduating class.
1995 - West Hills Wolf Pack Boys Cross Country wins first of four straight CIF section championships ('95,'96,'97,'98)
1998 - West Hills Wolf Pack Football wins first back to back league championships ('97 and '98)
1999 - Principal Marge Cole is reassigned after 74% of the faculty sign a letter of no confidence in her management style.
1999 - Jim Peabody becomes the new principal.
2000 - Teammates Evan Fox and Ben Aragon place 1st and 4th in the mile at the California State Track and Field Championships.
2003 - Mike Lewis becomes the new principal.
2005 - Brian Wilbur becomes the new principal.
2007 - Graduating class of '07 celebrated the 20th anniversary of West Hills High School.
2008 - Patrick Keeley becomes the new principal.
2009 - Girls Basketball win San Diego Division II CIF Championship to win the first section championship in Girls Basketball.
2011 - Paul Dautremont becomes the new principal.
2012 - WHHS's new swimming pool is officially unveiled.
2013 - WHHS introduces Wolfette, a second mascot.
2013 - Roller Hockey win the CIF Metro Conference Championship.
2015 - Robin Ballarin becomes the new principal.
2022 - April Baker becomes the new principal.

Extracurricular activities
Athletics

West Hill's athletic teams, the Wolf Pack, compete in the Hills League of the Grossmont Conference and the California Interscholastic Federation (CIF) San Diego Section.

The school fields teams in the following sports: baseball, boys' basketball, girls' basketball, cheerleading, boys' cross country, girls' cross country, football, boys' golf, girls' golf, gymnastics, roller hockey, boys' soccer, girls' soccer, softball, swimming, boys' tennis, girls' tennis, track and field, boys' volleyball, girls' volleyball, boys' water polo, girls' water polo, and wrestling

Clubs

There are a wide variety of clubs active during lunch and after school at West Hills High School.

Notable alumni
Stephen Strasburg, 2006, first overall pick in the 2009 MLB draft, pitcher for Washington Nationals, MVP of the 2019 MLB World Series
Dat Phan, 1993, Last Comic Standing winner (Season 1)
Mega64, 2002, Internet comedy troupe consisting of Rocco Botte, Derrick Acosta and Shawn Chatfield.
Christopher Cross, 1998, U.S. Marine Gunnery Sergeant, Purple Heart recipient, https://www.thepurpleheart.com/roll-of-honor/profile/default?rID=07948b5e-1bcd-4484-bd43-50bb64a68f72

References

External links
Grossmont Union High School District

High schools in San Diego County, California
Public high schools in California
Santee, California
Educational institutions established in 1987
1987 establishments in California